William Hill Boner (born February 14, 1945) is an American educator and former Democratic politician from Tennessee.  He was the third mayor of the Metropolitan government of Nashville and Davidson County, serving from 1987 to 1991. He served in the U.S. House of Representatives, as the Representative from the 5th District of Tennessee, from 1979 to 1988.

Biography

Congress

Several other persons had also decided to challenge Allen, a long-time Nashville political figure who appeared to be in declining health and who seemed vulnerable. Shortly before the deadline for candidates to withdraw from the race, Allen suffered a massive stroke. All of Allen's opponents except Boner withdrew from the race, apparently out of concern for "kicking a man when he's down." When Allen died on the day after the withdrawal deadline, Boner was virtually unopposed for the nomination, facing only a write-in campaign that went nowhere. This was tantamount to victory in November, as the Republicans had lost interest in a district they hadn't won since 1874. He was reelected four times with no substantive opposition.

Boner's tenure in Congress was largely uneventful. He established a reputation for a staff devoted to excellent constituent service, and otherwise as a moderate Southern Democrat backbencher, whose largest legislative accomplishment was a bill recognizing "National Sewing Month", something which subsequent opponents would later point to with glee. In 1986, he came under investigation by the House Ethics Committee for his close relationship with a government contractor.

Mayor
In 1987, Nashville Mayor (and former Fifth District Congressman) Richard Fulton was prevented from running for a fourth term. Boner quickly jumped into the race, seeing an opportunity to come home, and also to end the investigation. He was opposed by a large field, notably managed health care executive Phil Bredesen. Boner won the first round, but came up short of a majority.  Under the Metro Charter, Boner faced runner-up Bredesen in a runoff. Boner won, largely by emphasizing that he was a Nashville native and Bredesen was a Northerner (he was born in New Jersey and grew up in Upstate New York). He was the last native-born Tennessean to serve as Nashville mayor until David Briley became mayor in 2018.

Appearance on The Phil Donahue Show
During his term as mayor, Boner made a controversial appearance on the October 15, 1990 episode of The Phil Donahue Show.

Boner appeared on the show with Traci Peel, a country singer in Nashville. The couple were engaged, making their romance controversial, as Boner was still married to his third wife. It was reported that Peel had previously told a Nashville reporter that the Mayor's passion could last for seven hours. At one point in the Donahue appearance, Boner played harmonica, while Peel sang "Rocky Top".

Boner and Peel would eventually marry and then divorce after Peel caught Boner cheating two years into the marriage.

After term as mayor
Boner opted not to seek reelection for a second term, the only mayor not to do so from the creation of the Metro government until Megan Barry did not seek reelection in 2019 after resigning from office in 2018. Following retirement from political office, Boner briefly became a businessman, owning a pallet factory in Tompkinsville, Kentucky, and then becoming a restaurant franchisee in Atlanta.

Boner eventually returned to the Nashville area, becoming a social studies teacher at Franklin High School in Franklin, Tennessee. Sources had said that Boner had become a driver's ed instructor for the Williamson School System, and was "honest and open about the fact that he screwed up in office."

In 1995 and 1996, Boner hosted a nightly hour-long television interview show on Nashville's WNAB called Prime Talk.

Boner is reportedly retired and living with his wife, Kay, in Franklin, Tennessee.

References

Sources

 

1945 births
Living people
Heads of county government in Tennessee
Mayors of Nashville, Tennessee
Middle Tennessee State University alumni
Peabody College alumni
Trevecca Nazarene Trojans coaches
Democratic Party members of the United States House of Representatives from Tennessee
Schoolteachers from Tennessee